Eduard Nikolayevich Mudrik (18 July 1939 – 27 March 2017) was a Soviet footballer of Jewish ethnicity.

Honours
 Soviet Top League winner: 1959, 1963.
 1964 European Nations' Cup runner-up.

International career
He earned 8 caps for the USSR national football team, and participated in the 1964 European Nations' Cup, where the Soviets were the runners-up.

External links
Profile (in Russian)

References

1939 births
People from Starobilsk
2017 deaths
Russian footballers
Association football defenders
Soviet footballers
Soviet Union international footballers
1964 European Nations' Cup players
FC Dynamo Moscow players
Soviet Top League players
Jewish footballers
Ukrainian Jews
Burials in Troyekurovskoye Cemetery